Caetanópolis is a Brazilian municipality located in the northeast of the state of Minas Gerais. Its population  was 11,749 people living in a total area of 156 km². The city belongs to the meso-region of Metropolitana de Belo Horizonte and to the micro-region of Sete Lagoas.  It became a municipality in 1954.

The name
The name was chosen in 1953 to pay homage to Caetano Mascarenhas, who had built the first textile factory in the region.  The motto of the town on their welcoming sign is "Caetanópolis, o berço da industria téxtil no Brasil.

Location
The city center of Caetanópolis is located at an elevation of 742 meters just east of BR-040  and north of Sete Lagoas.   Neighboring  municipalities are:  Paraopeba and Sete Lagoas.

Distances
Belo Horizonte: 105 km south on BR-040
Paraopeba: 5 km
Sete Lagoas: 31 km south on BR-040
Cordisburgo: 29 km northeast on MG-231

Economic activities
Services, mining, agriculture, and small industries are the main economic activities.  There is a textile factory, Companhia de Fiação e Tecelagem Cedro e Cachoeira,  and slate mining.  The GDP in 2005 was approximately R$72 million, with 6 million reais from taxes, 34 million reais from services, 28 million reais from industry, and 3 million reais from agriculture.  There were 66 rural producers on 14,000 hectares of land (2006).  Approximately 250 persons were occupied in agriculture.  The main crops are citrus fruits, sugarcane, rice, beans, and corn.  There were 5,000 head of cattle, of which 1,500 were milk cows (2006).  Only 18 of the rural properties had tractors in 2006.

Of the working force there were 790 workers in 53 small industries, 420 workers in 153 retail units, 146 workers in 32 restaurants and hotels, and 46 workers in education (2006).

There was 1 bank (2007). In the vehicle fleet there were 1,108 automobiles, 93 trucks, 119 pickup trucks, 30 buses, and 359 motorcycles (2007).

Health and education
In the health sector there were 9 health establishments, which included 6 public health clinics, and 2 private clinics (2005).  There was 1 private hospital with 50 beds.  Educational needs of 2,270 students were met by 7 primary schools, 2 middle schools, and 4 pre-primary schools.

Municipal Human Development Index: 0.770 (2000)
State ranking: 168 out of 853 municipalities 
National ranking: 1,336 out of 5,138 municipalities 
Literacy rate: 92%
Life expectancy: 70 (average of males and females)

In 2000 the per capita monthly income of R$229.00 was below the state average of R$276.00 and below the national average of R$297.00.  Poços de Caldas had the highest per capita monthly income in 2000 with R$435.00.  The lowest was Setubinha with R$73.00.

The highest ranking municipality in Minas Gerais in 2000 was Poços de Caldas with 0.841, while the lowest was Setubinha with 0.568.  Nationally the highest was São Caetano do Sul in São Paulo with 0.919, while the lowest was Setubinha.  In more recent statistics (considering 5,507 municipalities) Manari in the state of Pernambuco has the lowest rating in the country—0,467—putting it in last place.

References

See also
 List of municipalities in Minas Gerais

Municipalities in Minas Gerais